Entometa apicalis is a species of moth of the  family Lasiocampidae. It is found in Australia, including Tasmania.

Lasiocampidae
Moths of Australia
Moths described in 1855